KXRW-LP 99.9 FM Community Radio is a low-power FM non-commercial radio station broadcasting in Vancouver, Washington. The station is licensed to the Media Institute for Social Change, an Oregon-based nonprofit organization. As of March 2017, KXRW-LP relays programming from KXRY, branded as XRAY.FM in Portland, Oregon.

References

External links
 

XRW-LP
2017 establishments in Washington (state)
Vancouver, Washington
Radio stations established in 2017
XRW-LP

Community radio stations in the United States